Musculium transversum is a species of freshwater bivalve from the family Sphaeriidae.

Distribution and conservation status
 Not listed in IUCN red list – not evaluated (NE)
 Germany

References

Sphaeriidae
Bivalves described in 1829